Ostrowąsy may refer to the following places in Poland:
Ostrowąsy, Lower Silesian Voivodeship (south-west Poland)
Ostrowąsy, West Pomeranian Voivodeship (north-west Poland)